Bagpat Ka Dulha is a film where no one wants Shiv Shukla and Anjali's marriage, even Shiv and Anjali too, comedy of errors, based in Baghpat Uttar Pradesh.

Plot
Cable operators and arch rivals Anjali Mishra (Ruchi Singh) and Shiva Shukla (Jae Singh) are dead against the idea of them getting married and so are their families, who have been locking horns for generations. But, fate has different plans altogether.

Cast
Raza Murad
Ravi Jhankal
Shubham Teotia
 Jae Sing
 Asrar Khan as an Announcer

References

External links 
 

2019 films
Indian romantic thriller films
2010s Hindi-language films
Bagpat district
2010s romantic thriller films